This is a list of caves in Mexico (not just archaeological):

Archaic era
 Guila Naquitz Cave (Oaxaca, c.8000-6700BC)
 Nogales Cave (Tamaulipas, c. 5000-3000 BC)
 Coxcatlan Cave (Tehuacan Valley, Puebla, 5000-3400 BC)
 La Perra Cave (Tamaulipas, c. 3000-2200 BC)
 Frightful Cave (Central Mexican Highlands, c. 7500 BC-185 AD)

Middle preclassic era
 Juxtlahuaca (Guerrero, Olmec-style painting cave)
 Oxtotitlan (Guerrero, Olmec-style painting cave)

Late preclassic era
 Loltun Cave (Yucatán, a painting cave of Maya civilization)

Postclassic era
 Balank'anche Cave (Yucatán, people offered a worship to Rain God and Xipe Totec with Toltec-style censers)

Modern era
 Cacahuamilpa Cave (Grutas de Cacahuamilpa National Park, Guerrero)
 Chevé Cave (Oaxaca)
 Chiquihuitillos (Nuevo León)
 Grutas de García (Nuevo León)
 Naica Crystal Caves (Chihuahua), largest gypsum crystals in the world
 Sistema Dos Ojos (Quintana Roo), underwater cave system
 Sistema Huautla (Oaxaca), deepest cave in the western hemisphere (as of 2013)
 Sistema Nohoch Nah Chich (Quintana Roo), underwater cave system; subsumed into Sac Actun in early 2007
 Sistema Ox Bel Ha (Quintana Roo), world's longest underwater cave system
 Sistema Sac Actun (Quintana Roo), world's second longest underwater cave system
 Sótano de las Golondrinas (Cave of Swallows, San Luis Potosí)
 Sierra Mixteca-Zapoteca incl Ndaxagua formation on Juquila aka Xiquila River

See also
 List of caves
Maya cave sites
 Speleology

References

 
 Mexico
Mexico
Caves (archaeological)